The 2011–12 Big Ten Conference men's basketball season began with practices in October 2015, followed by the start of the 2015–16 NCAA Division I men's basketball season in November. The season marked the first season of participation of the Nebraska Cornhuskers men's basketball team in Big Ten competition. With the addition of Nebraska, all teams will play seven other teams twice and four teams once during the conference schedule, which continues to be  18 games. The season commenced on October 14 when Michigan State and Minnesota celebrated Midnight Madness and three more conference schools hosted events on the 15th. For the fifth consecutive season, all conference games were broadcast nationally with eight aired by CBS Sports, 36 carried by the ESPN Inc. family of networks including ESPN and ESPN2, while 64 games were carried by the Big Ten Network.  The conference led the nation in attendance for the 36th consecutive season.

The regular season ended with Michigan, Michigan State and Ohio State tied for the league championship. Wisconsin finished in second place.

Michigan State's Draymond Green was named the Conference Player of the Year. Michigan State's Tom Izzo was named conference Coach of the Year.

Bankers Life Fieldhouse in Indianapolis, Indiana hosted the Big Ten tournament from March 8–March 11. Michigan State defeated Ohio State in the championship game to win the tournament championship. Draymond Green was also named tournament MVP. As a result, the Spartans received the conference's automatic bid to the NCAA tournament. Six teams (Indiana, Michigan, Michigan State, Ohio State, Purdue, and Wisconsin) received invitations to the NCAA tournament. The conference had an 11–6 record in the Tournament, with Indiana, Michigan State, Ohio State, and Wisconsin reaching the Sweet Sixteen. Ohio State advanced to the Final Four. Three teams (Iowa, Minnesota, and Northwestern) received bids to the National Invitation Tournament. The conference had a 6–3 record with Minnesota losing in the championship game.

Preseason
Three teams were ranked in the preseason USA Today/ESPN poll: Ohio State (No. 3), Wisconsin (No. 14) and Michigan (No. 18), while Michigan State and Purdue were also receiving votes. The Big Ten Basketball Media Day for men's and women's basketball was October 27 in Chicago.  The men's basketball media day was covered by ESPNU.

Jared Sullinger was named preseason conference player of the year at the conference media day. Other preseason All-Big Ten first team selections were Draymond Green, Trevor Mbakwe, Robbie Hummel, and Jordan Taylor. Ohio State was chosen as the top team, followed by Wisconsin and Michigan State. Sullinger and Taylor were also both preseason Associated Press All-Americans. 5 of the 30 nominees for the men's basketball Lowe's Senior CLASS Award were from the Big Ten: Michigan's Zack Novak, Michigan State's Green, Ohio State's William Buford, Purdue's Hummel and Wisconsin's Taylor.

Preseason watchlists

Midseason award lists
Trey Burke, Aaron Craft, Tim Frazier, Lewis Jackson and Jordan Taylor are five of the nearly 60 Bob Cousy Award candidates named in December. On January 4, Burke, Craft, and Taylor were included on the list of 20 finalists. On February 2, the finalist list was shortened to 11, including Taylor and Craft. William Buford, Draymond Green, Jared Sullinger, and Cody Zeller were included on the 25-man Wooden Midseason list on January 17. Novak, Green, Buford and Hummel were among the 10 finalists for the Lowe's Senior CLASS Award on January 25. On February 6, Green, Sullinger and Zeller were included on the 20-player Oscar Robertson Trophy midseason watch list. On February 15, Zeller was named one of five finalists for the USBWA National Freshman of the Year won the previous year by Sullinger. On March 1, Zeller, Green, Sullinger and Taylor were named to the 30-player midseason Naismith Award watchlist. On March 6, Green and Sullinger were named to the 15-man Wooden Award finalist list. On March 19, Green became one of four finalists for the Naismith Award. Sullinger and Green were among the 10 finalists for the Wooden Award, a designation termed as Wooden All-American.

Regular season
For the full season, the Big Ten led the nation in attendance. Conference play officially began on Tuesday, December 27 when Illinois hosted Minnesota and Nebraska hosted its first conference game against 11th-ranked Wisconsin.

Rankings

Early-season tournaments
Big Ten teams emerged victorious in the following tournaments:
 

*Although these tournaments include more teams, only the number listed play for the championship.

ACC–Big Ten Challenge

Composite matrix
This table summarizes the head-to-head results between teams in conference play. (x) indicates games remaining this season.

Players of the week
Throughout the conference regular season, the Big Ten offices named a player of the week each Monday.

On January 17, Brandon Paul was named national player of the week by the United States Basketball Writers Association.

On February 21 Draymond Green was named national player of the week by the USBWA.

Honors and awards
Four players (Novak, Craft, Drew Crawford and Jared Berggren)  were named Academic All-District, meaning that they were among the 40 finalists to be named to the 15-man Academic All-America Team. Craft was named to the first team, Crawford to the second team and Novak to the third team, giving the Big Ten three Academic All-Americans, which was more than any other conference.

Conference honors
Two sets of conference award winners were recognized by the Big Ten - one selected by league coaches and one selected by the media.

NABC
The National Association of Basketball Coaches announced their Division I All‐District teams on March 14, recognizing the nation’s best men’s collegiate basketball student-athletes. Selected and voted on by member coaches of the NABC, 240 student-athletes, from 24 districts were chosen. The selection on this list were then eligible for the State Farm Coaches’ Division I All-America teams. The following list represented the Big Ten players chosen to the list. Since the Big Ten Conference was its own district, this is equivalent to being named All-Big Ten by the NABC.

First Team
Draymond Green Michigan State
Jared Sullinger Ohio State
Jordan Taylor Wisconsin
William Buford Ohio State
John Shurna Northwestern
Second Team
Cody Zeller Indiana
Robbie Hummel Purdue
Tim Frazier Penn State
Trey Burke Michigan
Brandon Paul Illinois

USBWA
On March 6, the U.S. Basketball Writers Association released its 2011–12 Men's All-District Teams, based upon voting from its national membership. There were nine regions from coast to coast, and a player and coach of the year were selected in each. The following lists all the Big Ten representatives selected within their respective regions.

District II (NY, NJ, DE, DC, PA, WV)
None Selected
District V (OH, IN, IL, MI, MN, WI)
Player of the Year
Draymond Green, Michigan State
Coach of the Year
Tom Izzo, Michigan State
All-District Team
William Buford, Ohio State
Trey Burke, Michigan
Draymond Green, Michigan State
Robbie Hummel, Purdue
John Shurna, Northwestern
Jared Sullinger, Ohio State
Jordan Taylor, Wisconsin
Cody Zeller, Indiana
District VI (IA, MO, KS, OK, NE, ND, SD)
None Selected

National postseason honors
Sullinger and Green were first team 2012 NCAA Men's Basketball All-Americans by The Sporting News, while Zeller was a member of their All-Freshman team. Green and Sullinger were also first team All-American selections by the United States Basketball Writers Association. On March 20, the NABC chose Green and Sullinger as a first team All-Americans.  Sullinger and Green were named first team Associated Press All-Americans, making them unanimous first team selections. Trey Burke, Robbie Hummel, Jordan Taylor, John Shurna, and Cody Zeller were honorable mention selections. Hummel was named the Lowe's Senior CLASS Award winner.  Aaron Craft won the Elite 89 Award. Green was named the NABC Player of the Year. 41 men's basketball players in their second year or beyond earned Academic All-Big Ten recognition for carrying a cumulative grade-point average of 3.0 or higher.

CBSSports.com used a modified selection process that resulted in Green being named a first team All-American, while Sullinger and Burke were second team selections.  The process derided the traditional basketball All-American process of naming the best players and was modelled on the All-Pro or NHL All-Star team formula of choosing the best players by position. Shurna was also selected to participate in the NABC 2012 Reese's Division I All-Star Game at the 2012 NCAA Division I men's basketball tournament final four.

Postseason

Big Ten tournament

NCAA tournament

National Invitation Tournament

Other tournaments

The Big Ten did not have any entrants in the other post season tournaments.

2012 NBA draft

The following current 1st, 2nd & 3rd team All-Big Ten performers were listed as seniors: Draymond Green, Robbie Hummel, John Shurna, Jordan Taylor, Matt Gatens, William Buford. Former All-Big Ten performer and fifth-year Trevor Mbakwe has been granted a sixth year of eligibility by the NCAA, and he has opted to use it. The deadline for entering the NBA draft is April 29, but once one has declared, the deadline for withdrawing the declaration and retaining NCAA eligibility is April 10. The deadline for submitting information to the NBA Advisory Committee for a 72-hour response is April 3.

The following Big Ten underclassmen have sought the advice of the NBA's undergraduate advisory committee to determine his draft prospects: Trey Burke
The following Big Ten underclassmen declared early for the 2011 draft: Jared Sullinger, Meyers Leonard
The following Big Ten underclassmen entered their name in the draft but who did not hire agents and opted to return to college:

Notes

References

External links
Big Ten website
Men's basketball at Big Ten Network